Hajji Morteza Kandi (also Romanized as Ḩājjī Morteẕá Kandī; also known as Morteẕá Qeshlāq) is a village in Mahmudabad Rural District, Tazeh Kand District, Parsabad County, Ardabil Province, Iran. At the 2006 census, its population was 322, in 67 families.

References 

Towns and villages in Parsabad County